is a Japanese manga series written and illustrated by Katsumasa Enokiya. It was serialized in Shueisha's seinen manga magazine Weekly Young Jump from June 2010 to February 2015, with its chapters collected in six tankōbon volumes. A live action film adaptation premiered in November 2014.

Cast
Shuhei Nomura as Takurō Hibinuma
Fumi Nikaidō as Saki Utagawa

Media

Manga
Written and illustrated by Katsumasa Enokiya, Hibi Rock was serialized in Shueisha's seinen manga magazine Weekly Young Jump from June 3, 2010, to February 19, 2015. Shueisha collected its chapters in six tankōbon volumes, released from October 19, 2010, to March 19, 2015.

Volume list

Live action film
A live action film adaptation, directed by Yu Irie, was announced in March 2014. The film was distributed by Shochiku and premiered on November 22, 2014.

Reception
It was nominated for the fifth Manga Taishō, placing 11th out of the 15 nominees, with 32 points.

References

Further reading

External links
Official website of the film 

Films directed by Yu Irie
Live-action films based on manga
Manga adapted into films
Music in anime and manga
Seinen manga
Shueisha franchises
Shueisha manga
2010s Japanese films